"Hey Mr. DJ (Won't You Play Another Love Song)" is a duet performed by Swedish artists Per Gessle and Helena Josefsson. The song written by Gessle was the second single to be released from his Son of a Plumber project. It was initially reported that the Remix Single was to be issued to radio stations, and released only as a promo single. This decision was then changed after response to snippets of the remixes on his official website was positive.

Track listing

Swedish CD single
(0946 3542742 4; February 1, 2006)
"Hey Mr. DJ (Won't You Play Another Love Song)"
"Plumber in Progress #1"

Swedish Remix Promo CD single
(CDPRO 4389; February 13, 2006 to Radio Stations)
"Hey Mr. DJ (Won't You Play Another Love Song)" (Original Version)
"Hey Mr. DJ (Won't You Play Another Love Song)" (Love-for-sale remix)
"Hey Mr. DJ (Won't You Play Another Love Song)" (Jimmy Monell treatment)

Swedish Remix CD single
(0946 3591432 0; March 1, 2006)
"Hey Mr. DJ (Won't You Play Another Love Song)" (Original Version)
"Hey Mr. DJ (Won't You Play Another Love Song)" (Love-for-sale remix)
"Hey Mr. DJ (Won't You Play Another Love Song)" (Jimmy Monell treatment)

Charts

References

Per Gessle songs
Songs written by Per Gessle
2006 singles
2005 songs